John Richard Paxton (born 1938) is a United States-born Australian ichthyologist, who spent most of his career at the Australian Museum. He has a particular research interest in lanternfishes (family Myctophidae) and other deep-sea fishes. Paxton is a founding member of the Australian Society for Fish Biology and received the society's K. Radway Allen Award in 1997.

Early life 
John Richard Paxton was born in 1938 and grew up in Los Angeles, California. He completed his undergraduate and postgraduate studies at the University of Southern California, beginning with a BA in Zoology (1960) and an MSc in Biology (1965). His master's research investigated the ecology and vertical distribution of lanternfishes (family Myctophidae) in a deep-sea basin off southern California. Paxton completed his PhD under supervisor Jay Savage, on the osteology and evolutionary history of lanternfishes, and graduated in 1968.

Career 
Paxton spent most of his career at the Australian Museum in Sydney, Australia. He arrived in February 1968 as the museum's Curator of Fishes. Over the next 30 years, Paxton increased the size of the Australian Museum's fish collection from 80,000 specimens to more than 1 million. This created the third-largest marine fish collection in the world, and the largest in Australia. Paxton attributes the growth of the fish collection to a number of factors, including increases in personnel, new collecting techniques, increased exploratory fishing by fisheries vessels, and a more efficient collections registration system. In 1997, the Australian Museum fish collection included more than 450,000 registered juvenile or adult specimens and more than 500,000 larval specimens.

In 1981, Paxton and colleague Doug Hoese founded the Indo-Pacific Fish Conference, which has since run every four years. Paxton retired in 1998, but remained active at the museum as a research fellow (1998–2006), senior research fellow (2006–07) and senior fellow (2007–present).

Australian Society for Fish Biology 
Paxton is a founding member of the Australian Society for Fish Biology, and a frequent attendee of the society's annual conferences. He served as the society's second President from 1976–77, and was made an honorary life member in 1991. In 1997, Paxton was awarded the K. Radway Allen Award for his contributions to Australian fish research.

Legacy 
Paxton taught an ichthyology course at Macquarie University in the 1970s, and supervised one honours, three MSc and four PhD students. He has published more than 100 scientific papers, as well as two editions of the major reference text, Encyclopaedia of Fishes. As of 2013, he had described 16 new species and nine new genera.

Taxon described by him
As of 2013, he had described 16 new species and nine new genera. 
See :Category:Taxa named by John Richard Paxton

Taxon named in his honor 
Eighteen species and one genus have been named in his honour.
Paxton's tilefish Branchiostegus paxtoni Dooley & Kailola, 1988. is one of them.

Publications

References 

1938 births
Living people
Australian ichthyologists
20th-century Australian zoologists
American emigrants to Australia